Populated places in Estonia (officially: settlement units), are cities or settlement units of rural municipalities, but only cities have administrative functions. Settlement units are divided into settlements and urban regions (subdivisions of cities).

Officially there are five types of settlement units in Estonia:
town/city
town without municipal status
borough
small borough
village

See also 
Municipalities of Estonia
List of cities and towns in Estonia
Counties of Estonia

Notes

External links 
Place Names Board of Estonia
Territory of Estonia Administrative Division Act

 
Geography of Estonia
Subdivisions of Estonia